Podor is a small impact crater in the Argyre quadrangle of Mars, on the northeast rim of the larger crater Hooke, located at 44.11° N and 43.14° W. It is 25.08 km in diameter. Its name was approved in 1976 by the International Astronomical Union (IAU) Working Group for Planetary System Nomenclature (WGPSN), and was named after Podor, a town in Senegal.

See also 
 List of craters on Mars: O-Z

References 

Impact craters on Mars
Argyre quadrangle